Washington, D.C. is a national center for patient care and medical research. There is currently a total of 16 medical centers and hospitals located within the District of Columbia. There are also numerous medical research centers in the Washington area, most notably the National Institutes of Health in Bethesda, Maryland.

Washington Hospital Center (WHC) is the largest hospital campus in the District and is both the largest private and the largest non-profit hospital in the Washington Metropolitan Area. Immediately adjacent to the WHC is the National Rehabilitation Hospital and Children's National Medical Center. Children's is among the highest ranked pediatric hospitals in the country according to U.S. News & World Report and also provides care at 23 regional outpatient centers throughout the Washington Metropolitan Area.

Another prominent hospital in Washington, D.C. is the Walter Reed Army Medical Center. The 550-bed hospital provides care for active-duty and retired personnel and their dependents from all branches of the armed forces. Due to a new Department of Defense base realignment plan, Walter Reed is scheduled to move in 2011 to a facility in Bethesda, Maryland near the National Naval Medical Center. Armed Forces veterans also receive care at the Veterans Affairs Medical Center on the grounds of the Old Soldier's Home in Washington. 

Three universities in Washington, D.C. have medical schools and associated teaching hospitals. The George Washington University Medical Center treated President Reagan in 1981 after a failed assassination attempt; the hospital's emergency department is named in his honor. Georgetown University Hospital is home to the Lombardi Cancer Center, the only comprehensive cancer center in the area recognized by the National Cancer Institute. Howard University Hospital is the only hospital in the nation on the campus of a historically black university.

Providence Hospital, now closed, is in Northeast D.C. was chartered by Abraham Lincoln in 1861
and was the city's oldest hospital in continuous operation until closure in 2019. The Specialty Hospital of Washington (SHW) is a long-term acute care facility located near Capitol Hill in Northeast D.C. SHW's sister facility, Hadley Memorial Hospital, is located in Southwest Washington. There are two additional private, non-profit community hospitals in Washington: Sibley Memorial Hospital in upper Northwest; and United Medical Center (formerly Greater Southeast Community Hospital), which generally serves the population east of the Anacostia River. St. Elizabeths Hospital was the first federally funded institution for the mentally ill. The hospital is a National Historic Landmark but has since fallen into disrepair and serves only a small number of patients. There are two other psychiatric hospitals located in the city: Riverside Hospital and the Psychiatric Institute of Washington.

The District of Columbia General Hospital near Capitol Hill was the city's only public health care facility. Mayor Anthony Williams shut down D.C. General in 2001 in order to manage the city's recovery from bankruptcy; the hospital lost money each year and its expenses became too great for the city to cover. In 2008, Mayor Fenty announced plans for a possible new "healthplex" on the site of D.C. General Hospital.

See also
 Lead contamination in Washington, D.C. drinking water

References